Grzegorz Kubiak (born 9 February 1963) is a Polish equestrian. He competed in the individual jumping event at the 2004 Summer Olympics.

References

External links
 

1963 births
Living people
Polish male equestrians
Olympic equestrians of Poland
Equestrians at the 2004 Summer Olympics
People from Piotrków County